In algebraic geometry, determinantal varieties are spaces of matrices with a given upper bound on their ranks. Their significance comes from the fact that many examples in algebraic geometry are of this form, such as the Segre embedding of a product of two projective spaces.

Definition

Given m and n and r < min(m, n), the determinantal variety Y r is the set of all m × n matrices (over a field k) with rank ≤ r. This is naturally an algebraic variety as the condition that a matrix have rank ≤ r is given by the vanishing of all of its (r + 1) × (r + 1) minors. Considering the generic m × n matrix whose entries are algebraically independent variables x i,j, these minors are polynomials of degree r + 1. The ideal of k[x i,j] generated by these polynomials is a determinantal ideal. Since the equations defining minors are homogeneous, one can consider Y r either as an affine variety in mn-dimensional affine space, or as a projective variety in (mn − 1)-dimensional projective space.

Properties

The radical ideal defining the determinantal variety is generated by the (r + 1) × (r + 1) minors of the matrix (Bruns-Vetter, Theorem 2.10).

Assuming that we consider Y r as an affine variety, its dimension is r(m + n − r). So  since they are birationally equivalent, and  since the fiber of  has dimension nr.

This fact can be verified using that the radical ideal is given by the minors along with the Jacobian criterion for nonsingularity.

Related topics

One can "globalize" the notion of determinantal varieties by considering the space of linear maps between two vector bundles on an algebraic variety. Then the determinantal varieties fall into the general study of degeneracy loci. An expression for the cohomology class of these degeneracy loci is given by the Thom-Porteous formula, see (Fulton-Pragacz).

References

Algebraic geometry
Algebraic varieties